

Buildings and structures

Buildings

 1690
 The Sindone Chapel in Turin, Piedmont, designed by Guarino Guarini is completed.
 The Barrage Vauban, designed by Vauban and built by Jacques Tarade in Strasbourg, France, is completed
 1690–1700 – Two Baroque palaces in Vilnius, Sapieha Palace and Slushko Palace, designed by Pietro Perti, are erected.
 1689–1691 – Swallowfield Park, near Reading, Berkshire, England, designed by William Talman, is built.
 1691–1697 – Branicki Palace, Białystok, Poland, designed by Tylman van Gameren, is built.
 1692
 St. Kazimierz Church, Warsaw, Poland, designed by Tylman van Gameren, is completed.
 Theatine Church, Munich, Bavaria, designed by Agostino Barelli in 1662, is substantially completed to the design of Enrico Zuccalli.
 1694
 The Potala Palace in Lhasa is completed by construction of the Potrang Marpo ('Red Palace').
 The Radziejowski Palace in Nieborów, Poland, designed by Tylman van Gameren, is built.
 The Chapel of the Holy Shroud in Turin, begun by Amedeo di Castellamonte in 1668, is completed to the design of Guarino Guarini.
 1695 – Wren Library, the library of Trinity College, Cambridge, England, designed by Christopher Wren, is completed.

 1695–1699 – Craigiehall, near Edinburgh, Scotland, designed by Sir William Bruce.
 1696
 Main façades of Chatsworth House completed to designs of William Talman in a pioneering English Baroque style.
 Library of The Queen's College, Oxford, designed locally, is completed.
 Construction of Schönbrunn Palace in Vienna to the design of Johann Bernhard Fischer von Erlach begins.
 1697 – Trinity Cathedral in Solikamsk, Russia (begun 1683), is completed.
 1698 – Fortified town of Neuf-Brisach in Alsace, designed by Sébastien Le Prestre de Vauban, is begun.
 1699 – Castle Howard in Yorkshire, England (completed 1712), designed by Sir John Vanbrugh and Nicholas Hawksmoor, is begun.

Events
 1696 – Window tax is introduced in England.
 1697: May 7 – The 13th century royal Tre Kronor ("Three Crowns") castle in Stockholm burns to the ground; the plan for the replacement Stockholm Palace by Nicodemus Tessin the Younger is presented a few weeks later.

Births
 1690 – Richard Cassels, German-born architect working in Ireland (died 1751)
 1691
 June 17 – Giovanni Paolo Panini, Italian painter and architect (died 1765)
 September 1 – James Burrough, English academic, amateur architect and antiquary (died 1764)
 1692 – Pietro Antonio Trezzini, Swiss architect working in Saint Petersburg (died after 1760)
 1693
 January 29 – Henry, Lord Herbert, later Earl of Pembroke, English courtier and architect (died 1749)
 September 13 – Joseph Emanuel Fischer von Erlach, Viennese architect (died 1742)
 1694
 April 25 – Richard Boyle, 3rd Earl of Burlington, English aristocrat and architect (died 1753)
 September 26 – Martin Schmid, Swiss Jesuit missionary, musician and architect working in Bolivia (died 1772)
 1695
 April 19 – Roger Morris, English architect (died 1749)
 October 23 – François de Cuvilliés, Walloon-born dwarf and architect working in Bavaria (died 1768)
 1696: September 14 (bapt.) – Batty Langley, English garden architect (died 1751)
 1698: October 23 – Ange-Jacques Gabriel, French architect (died 1782)
 1699
 Edward Lovett Pearce, Irish architect (died 1733)
 (probable date) – Matthew Brettingham, English architect (died 1769)

Deaths
 1691: February 8 – Carlo Rainaldi, Roman architect (born 1611)

References

Architecture